Oscar H. Mauzy (November 9, 1926 – October 10, 2000) was an American politician who served in the Texas Senate from the 23rd district from 1967 to 1987 and as an Associate Justice of the Supreme Court of Texas from January 3, 1987 to December 31, 1992.

He died of lung cancer on October 10, 2000, in Austin, Texas at age 73.

References

External links 
 

1926 births
2000 deaths
Democratic Party Texas state senators
Justices of the Texas Supreme Court
20th-century American politicians
20th-century American judges